Malith de Silva (born 26 March 1992) is a Sri Lankan cricketer. He made his List A debut for Sri Lanka Police Sports Club in the 2019–20 Invitation Limited Over Tournament on 23 December 2019. He made his Twenty20 debut for Police Sports Club in the 2019–20 SLC Twenty20 Tournament on 4 January 2020. He made his first-class debut for Police Sports Club in Tier B of the 2019–20 Premier League Tournament on 19 February 2020.

References

External links
 

1992 births
Living people
Sri Lankan cricketers
Sri Lanka Police Sports Club cricketers